Terminal City was a Canadian miniseries about a woman (Maria del Mar) diagnosed with breast cancer. She's brought in to star on a failing reality TV show, turning it into a hit as her life and body begin to change.

Production
Angus Fraser, a native of Vancouver, was the director-creator, with Rachel Talalay also brought in as a director. As the writer, Fraser was partly inspired by a close call his mother had with cancer, and his own near-death experience when he was stabbed in the heart as a bouncer. Originally conceived as a feature film, Terminal City was filmed in Victoria, British Columbia in 76 days and won 11 Leo Awards plus 2 nominations.

Cast 
 Maria del Mar - Katie
 Gil Bellows - Ari
 Paul Soles - Saul
 Jane McLean - Jane
 Nakul Kapoor - Yash
 Katie Boland - Sarah
 Adam Butcher - Nicky
 Nico McEown - Eli
 Bill Mondy - Frank
 Michael Eklund - Henry
 Ross Birchall - Kristov
 Andrew McIlroy - Brendan

Plot
Fraser's plot follows a family woman who finds she has cancer and becomes the star of a reality show simultaneously.

Critical reviews
Timeout says the show "prominently counts reality TV among its subjects, but its chief concerns—marriage, family and mortality—are timeless ones that are given fresh urgency by the way screenwriter Angus Fraser approaches them from odd angles."

 "Terminal City...A new breed (and calibre) of must-see Canadian TV." - Gayle MacDonald, The Globe and Mail
 "World class writing and acting...HBO calibre." - John McKay, Canadian Press
 "A challenging, deeply disturbing 10-part hour drama that raises the bar considerably." - Jim Bawden, Star Week
 "Terminal City is one of the most original and intricate explorations of family dynamics ever created for television in this country." - Alison Cunningham, TV Times
 "Morality comes calling: Terminal City is like Six Feet Under with a comic twist." - Bill Brioux, Toronto Sun
 "Exceptional drama." - Alex Strachan, CanWest News Service
 "A challenging, relentlessly ambitious ride worth taking." - BB, Dose
 "Elegantly sinister, comic and deeply moving. Maria Del Mar in the tough lead role, handles it with aplomb." - John Doyle, The Globe and Mail
 "Challenging, evocative, addictive." - Rob Salem, The Toronto Star
 "New provocative drama." - Tara Merrin, Calgary Sun

Broadcasters
 In Canada, Terminal City originally aired its first run episodes on The Movie Network and Movie Central in 2005, later being rerun on Citytv.
 In the United States, Sundance Channel picked up the series and began airing the series in March 2008.

References

External links

 Official website
 

2000s Canadian drama television series
2000s Canadian television miniseries
2005 Canadian television series debuts
2005 Canadian television series endings
Citytv original programming
Crave original programming
Television shows filmed in Victoria, British Columbia
Television shows set in British Columbia